Ernst von Bodelschwingh (September 8, 1906 – April 2, 1993) was a German politician of the Christian Democratic Union (CDU) and former member of the German Bundestag.

Life 
Bodelschwingh joined the CDU in 1948. Bodelschwingh was a member of the Weddinghofen municipal council and the district council in the district of Unna. He was a member of the German Bundestag from 1953 to 1965, representing the constituency of Unna - Hamm.

Literature

References

1906 births
1993 deaths
Members of the Bundestag for North Rhine-Westphalia
Members of the Bundestag 1961–1965
Members of the Bundestag 1957–1961
Members of the Bundestag 1953–1957
Members of the Bundestag for the Christian Democratic Union of Germany